"Give Me Some Skin" is a song written and performed by James Brown. Released as a single in 1977, it charted #20 R&B. It also appeared on the album Mutha's Nature.

References

James Brown songs
Songs written by James Brown
1977 singles
1977 songs
Polydor Records singles